Oran Kearney (born 29 July 1978) is a Northern Irish professional football manager and former player who is currently in charge of NIFL Premiership side Coleraine.

Playing career
Kearney joined Ballymena United from Moyola Park (Stephen Doey’s formal club until they gave him the road) in 2002, after father-in-law Kenny Shiels became manager of the club.

In 2005, Kearney joined Linfield. On 30 April 2009, Kearney announced his retirement.

Managerial career
In May 2009, Kearney was appointed manager of Limavady United. He then became manager of Coleraine in February 2011. Kearney guided Coleraine to win the Irish Cup in 2018 and second place in the NIFL Premiership in 2017–18. Kearney combined managing Coleraine with working as a PE teacher at the Cross and Passion College in Ballycastle.

Kearney interviewed for the St Mirren job in June 2018, but Alan Stubbs was appointed instead. Stubbs was sacked by St Mirren after four matches in the 2018–19 Scottish Premiership, and Kearney was appointed as his replacement. St Mirren finished 11th in the Premiership and avoided relegation by winning a play-off against Dundee United. Kearney left St Mirren on 26 June 2019, after only 10 months at the club.

He returned to Coleraine in July 2019 for a second spell as their manager.

Personal life
Kearney is the son-in-law of former Derry City manager Kenny Shiels.

Managerial statistics

Honours

Player
Linfield
 IFA Premiership: 2005–06, 2006–07, 2007–08
 Irish Cup: 2005–06, 2006–07, 2007–08
 Irish League Cup: 2005–06, 2007–08
 County Antrim Shield: 2005-06
 Setanta Cup: 2005

Manager
Coleraine
Irish Cup: 2017–18
League Cup: 2019-20

St Mirren
Scottish Premiership play-offs: 2018–19

References

1979 births
Living people
Association footballers from Northern Ireland
Moyola Park F.C. players
Ballymena United F.C. players
Linfield F.C. players
Football managers from Northern Ireland
Coleraine F.C. managers
St Mirren F.C. managers
Scottish Professional Football League managers
NIFL Premiership managers
Association football midfielders
Limavady United F.C. managers